Dave Ross (born 16 November 1963) is a Canadian former rower. He competed at the 1984 Summer Olympics and the 1988 Summer Olympics.  He graduated from Yale College and Harvard Business School.

References

External links
 

1963 births
Living people
Canadian male rowers
Olympic rowers of Canada
Rowers at the 1984 Summer Olympics
Rowers at the 1988 Summer Olympics
Sportspeople from British Columbia
Pan American Games medalists in rowing
Pan American Games bronze medalists for Canada
Rowers at the 1983 Pan American Games
Yale Bulldogs rowers
Harvard Business School alumni